John Furman Wall (born October 19, 1931) is a retired lieutenant general in the United States Army. He served as Commander of the United States Army Strategic Defense Command.

References

United States Army generals
1931 births
Living people